County Route 537 (CR 537) is a county highway in the U.S. state of New Jersey. The highway extends  from Delaware Avenue (CR 737) in Camden to CR 11 in Oceanport. It is the state's fourth longest 500 series county route.

Route description

Camden and Burlington counties

CR 537 begins at an intersection with CR 737 in the downtown area of Camden in Camden County, heading east on four-lane undivided Federal Street. West of this intersection, Federal Street continues to the Camden Waterfront on the Delaware River. The road runs east passing a few parking lots, turning into a one-way eastbound street at 3rd Street. CR 537 Spur (Market Street) to the north is one-way westbound, serving as the westbound direction of CR 537 through downtown Camden. From here, Federal Street passes downtown businesses as it alternates between two and four lanes, crossing NJ Transit's River Line at the 5th Street junction. The route intersects CR 551 and the northern terminus of CR 561 before coming to an interchange with I-676. After this, CR 537 Spur merges onto CR 537 and the road becomes two-way and two lanes wide as it passes under a railroad line that carries Conrail Shared Assets Operations' Vineland Secondary and the River Line. The route interchanges with US 30 and crosses the Cooper River and intersects CR 543. The road passes through urban areas of businesses and industry, crossing CR 601 and becoming lined with businesses. CR 537 comes to junctions with CR 610 and CR 609 as it heads into more residential areas, intersecting CR 611. At this point, the road becomes the border between Pennsauken Township to the north and Camden to the south, meeting CR 663. The route fully enters Pennsauken Township and turns north and east as a four-lane divided highway, interchanging with US 130 in commercial areas. CR 537 becomes two lanes and undivided again as it heads into suburban Merchantville as Maple Avenue, passing through wooded areas of homes. The road intersects CR 612 and CR 613 prior to passing a few businesses as it reaches the junctions with CR 626, CR 621, and CR 622. The route passes more homes, crossing CR 616 and then passing over NJ Transit's Atlantic City Line on a bridge. CR 537 then passes businesses as it intersects CR 615. At a point shortly before the intersection with CR 644, CR 537 becomes the border between Pennsauken Township to the north and Cherry Hill to the south. Shortly after this crossing, the road heads through more residential surroundings.

Upon crossing the Pennsauken Creek, CR 537 enters Maple Shade Township in Burlington County and becomes West Main Street, passing a mix of homes and businesses before heading into the commercial downtown of Maple Shade. The name of the route changes to East Main Street after crossing Fork Landing Road and intersects CR 610 as it continues into residential and business areas and meeting CR 609. After an interchange with Route 73, the road crosses the North Branch of the Pennsauken Creek into Moorestown Township and becomes Camden Avenue as it passes a few businesses before crossing CR 608. At this point, CR 537 enters wooded areas of homes and reaches the CR 611 junction, where the route turns northeast onto West Main Street. The road passes homes and businesses in the downtown area of Moorestown, crossing CR 607 and becoming East Main Street. The route passes more homes and briefly joins CR 603 before coming to CR 615. CR 537 becomes Marne Highway at this intersection and turns east as it runs immediately to the south of Conrail Shared Assets Operations' Pemberton Industrial Track line, passing a mix of business parks and fields. Upon intersecting Centerton Road, the route turns north as a four-lane divided highway and heads through fields, crossing the railroad tracks and continuing into Mount Laurel Township. At the CR 614 junction, CR 537 turns southeast as a two-lane undivided road, turning east and running parallel to the north of the Conrail tracks again as it passes under I-295 and the New Jersey Turnpike, within a short distance of each other. The road heads through a mix of farms and homes as it crosses CR 686 before continuing east into areas of residential subdivisions as it crosses CR 635. The route heads through more wooded areas of residences as it intersects CR 636 and enters Hainesport Township. CR 537 passes between homes and businesses to the north and industrial areas to the south as it comes to the CR 674 junction. The road passes over the South Branch of the Rancocas Creek and passes more residential areas as it intersects CR 641.

The road crosses CR 541 and runs near more homes, intersecting CR 692 before it heads into Mount Holly Township and becomes Washington Street. The route passes businesses as it crosses CR 691 and continues into the commercial downtown of Mount Holly as Mill Street, coming to a junction with CR 612 as it curves northeast and east past more homes. CR 537 turns northeast onto Branch Street, with CR 621 continuing along Mill Street. The route intersects CR 617 and continues northeast along Garden Street. Upon crossing into Eastampton Township, CR 537 becomes Monmouth Road and passes more residences before passing businesses at the junction with CR 630. The road continues into a mix of farmland, woodland, and homes after this intersection and meets CR 684 before entering Springfield Township. The route heads through open farm fields here and intersects CR 669 prior to crossing US 206. The road passes through more agriculture and woods with occasional residences as it intersects CR 684 before CR 670 briefly joins the road. Farther northeast, CR 537 crosses Route 68 and turns more to the east as it passes woods to the north and agricultural areas to the south. After intersecting CR 545 in commercial areas, the route enters Chesterfield Township and passes more farms before passing through rural areas of homes and crossing into North Hanover Township. The road heads through more farmland as it comes to the CR 665 junction before passing near residential subdivisions and crossing CR 528. After this junction, the road becomes concurrent with CR 528 Truck and passes through woods before heading into open farmland.

Ocean and Monmouth counties

After crossing Province Line Road, CR 537 becomes the border between Upper Freehold Township, Monmouth County, to the northwest and Plumsted Township, Ocean County, to the southeast. The road heads through a mix of farms, wooded areas, and some development, intersecting CR 27/CR 8. Farther northeast, the route passes near businesses as it intersects another segment of CR 27 as well as CR 26 prior to crossing CR 539, where CR 528 Truck turns south along CR 539. Past CR 539, CR 537 enters more forested areas with a few homes and farms, becoming the border between Upper Freehold Township to the northwest and Jackson Township at the CR 640 junction. The route heads into dense forests and becomes the border between Millstone Township to the northwest and Jackson Township to the southeast, passing to the west of Prospertown Lake before coming to the entrance of the Six Flags Great Adventure amusement park, which is located in Jackson Township. CR 537 intersects an exit from the amusement park before coming to an interchange with a westbound exit and eastbound entrance that serves Six Flags. At this point, the route widens into a six-lane divided highway with a Jersey barrier and jughandles, passing a mix of woods and businesses before reaching the I-195 interchange. At this interchange, CR 537 narrows back into a two-lane undivided road and passes the Jackson Premium Outlets before crossing CR 526/CR 571. Past this junction, the road heads into forested areas with some residences.

CR 537 fully enters Monmouth County and becomes the border between Millstone Township to the northwest and Freehold Township to the southeast, passing through more forests before coming to an intersection with CR 524. CR 524 forms a concurrency with CR 537 at this point, with the two routes continuing northeast.  Upon crossing CR 527 in Smithburg, the road forms the border between Manalapan Township and Freehold Township as it passes near farms and homes. In the community of Elton, CR 524 splits from CR 537 by turning east onto Elton-Adelphia Road, with CR 537 continuing northeast past residential subdivisions. Upon crossing Thompson Grove Road, the route fully enters Freehold Township and becomes West Main Street, passing more housing developments along with some farms. The road widens to four lanes and briefly becomes a divided highway after intersecting Gravel Hill Road. From here, the route becomes undivided shortly before passing CentraState Medical Center to the north and enters several business areas. After intersecting Wal-Mart Drive and Castranova Way, the road reaches an interchange with the Route 33 freeway. From this interchange, CR 537 passes the entrance to the Freehold Raceway Mall, as well as a farm to the south, prior to interchanging with US 9. At this point, the road heads into Freehold Borough on Main Street and passes homes as it intersects Route 33 Business. The route narrows to two lanes as it intersects CR 24 and continues into the commercial downtown of Freehold. At this point, CR 537 passes southeast of the Freehold Center bus terminal and crosses the Freehold Industrial Track railroad line operated by the Delaware and Raritan River Railroad at the CR 522 junction before coming to Route 79. Here, Route 79 forms a brief concurrency with CR 537 before it heads north on Broadway. CR 537 continues east-northeast along East Main Street, passing through residential areas and meeting the trailhead of the Henry Hudson Trail. The route crosses back into Freehold Township and becomes Colts Neck Road as it passes through more areas of housing developments and intersecting CR 55 at a signalized intersection where westbound CR 537 traffic exits before the signal to travel through a small interchange to access CR 55.

Upon entering Colts Neck Township, the road comes to an interchange with the Route 18 freeway. CR 537 continues past Colts Neck High School, along with more homes, and passes Hominy Hill Golf Course to the south in the Bucks Mill section of the township, before coming to the Route 34 junction. At this intersection, CR 537 becomes County Road East (unsigned) and heads into agricultural areas. After passing under Normandy Road, which serves as a road and railroad link between the two sections of Naval Weapons Station Earle, the route heads northeast through a mix of farms and housing developments. Upon intersecting CR 50, CR 537 heads into Tinton Falls and turns southeast onto Tinton Avenue. The road enters wooded areas of homes, coming to junctions with CR 13A and CR 38. After the latter intersection, the route turns east and passes over the Garden State Parkway. The road passes more homes before crossing CR 51 into Eatontown. In this area, CR 537 passes more development and crosses the Southern Secondary railroad line operated by the Delaware and Raritan River Railroad before intersecting Route 35 at the former entrance to Fort Monmouth. The route enters the former military base on a road known as the Avenue of Memories. On this portion, the road is lined by trees and memorials to U.S. Army Signal Corps soldiers killed during World War II. It enters Oceanport still within the confines of Fort Monmouth traveling along Saltzman Avenue and Hildreth Avenue before ending at a signalized intersection with CR 11 (Oceanport Avenue).

History
From Mount Holly to Moorestown, the road was part of a King's Highway extending from South Amboy to Salem, chartered in 1681.

In the mid-19th century, several turnpikes maintained what would become CR 537: 

 Moorestown and Camden Turnpike: Camden to Moorestown, chartered in 1849, following what is now CR 551 to Camden 
 Mount Holly and Moorestown Turnpike: Moorestown to Mount Holly, chartered in 1852, built on the road built as part of the King's Highway 
 Mount Holly and Jobstown Turnpike: Mount Holly to Jobstown, chartered in 1853 
 Freehold and Smithville Turnpike: Smithburg to Freehold, chartered in 1858 
 Freehold and Colt's Neck Turnpike: Freehold to Colt's Neck, chartered in 1859 
 Tinton Falls Turnpike: Colt's Neck to Shrewsbury, following Sycamore Avenue to Shrewsbury Village, with a branch to Eatontown, chartered in 1866

The road from Camden to Sykesville was signed as part of the Camp Dix Way, an auto trail extending from Camden to Point Pleasant. The road from Camden to what is now US 206 was part of Route 38 until a bypass route was built.

Another County Route 537 Spur previously existed, which is now Burlington County Routes 613 and 614.

 
The road that now carries CR 537 through the former Fort Monmouth was originally open to the public but closed after the September 11 attacks. Following the base's closure in 2011, the gates across the Avenue of Memories were locked. As a requirement for the issuance of bonds by Monmouth County for use in redevelopment of the former base, the county required the allowance for public through traffic on the road. In 2016, the county started reconstruction on the  road through the base. The completed reconstructed road was opened to the public on January 17, 2017 and subsequently made part of CR 537. Upon opening, both directions of travel will use Saltzman Avenue and Hildreth Avenue on the Oceanport side of the fort. However, in the future, the roads will be reconfigured as a one-way pair similarly to how the roads operated when the base was in use. Eastbound traffic will use Saltzman and Hildreth avenues while westbound traffic will use Russel Avenue, Sherill Avenue, and Wilson Avenue.

Prior to 2017, CR 537's eastern terminus was in Long Branch at the intersection of Broadway and Myrtle Avenue. From its present intersection with Route 35 outside of Fort Monmouth in Eatontown, it traveled south on Route 35 running concurrent with it for just under , ran along Route 71 from its northern terminus in downtown Eatontown to the Oceanport boundary, then along Eatontown Boulevard and Broadway through Oceanport, West Long Branch (where it intersected Route 36), and Long Branch. On February 23, 2017, the Monmouth County Board of Chosen Freeholders passed a resolution officially making the road through Fort Monmouth part of CR 537 while the old county-maintained portions of Eatontown Boulevard and Broadway became an extension of CR 547 (which previously ended at Route 71 and CR 537 in Eatontown). However , signage for CR 537 still appears along the former section of the road from Fort Monmouth's entrance to Long Branch.

Major intersections

Special routes

County Route 537 Spur (CR 537 Spur) extends  from Delaware Avenue to CR 537 in Camden. The route is one-way westbound and serves as the westbound direction of CR 537 through downtown Camden.

Major intersections

See also

References

External links

Monmouth County CR 537 Corridor Study
New Jersey 5xx Routes (Dan Moraseski)
CR 537 pictures

537
537
537
537
537